A by-election was held for the New South Wales Legislative Assembly electorate of Wellington on 1868 because Saul Samuel had been appointed Colonial Treasurer in the second Robertson ministry. Such ministerial by-elections were usually uncontested and on this occasion the other ministers were all re-elected unopposed.

Philip Risby Holdsworth was the secretary of the protection league and opposed to the free trade treasurer. This was the first occasion on which he stood for parliament.

Dates

Polling places

Result

Saul Samuel was appointed Colonial Treasurer in the second Robertson ministry.

See also
 Electoral results for the district of Wellington
 List of New South Wales state by-elections

References

1868 elections in Australia
New South Wales state by-elections
1860s in New South Wales